Oncomodulin is a parvalbumin-family calcium-binding protein expressed and secreted by macrophages (that typically traffic to tissue as an inflammatory response or after injury).

Oncomodulin is present in the eye. It is small, acidic, has a high calcium-binding activity, and consists of 108 amino acid residues. It is released by macrophages in the vitreous and the retina to promote nerve regeneration in the eye. This regeneration can be done in response to inflammation in the eye and promote regrowth in the eye to repair retinal injury. The regeneration effects of oncomodulin outcompetes other neurotrophic factors like BDNF, CNTF, and GDNF. When added to retinal nerve cells in a petri dish with no other growth factors present, oncomodulin has been shown to promote neuron regrowth at 5-7 times the normal rate.

Oncomodulin has been found in cytotrophoblasts of human and rat placenta and in the early stages of embryos. In vivo, oncomodulin promotes regeneration of the optic nerve in rats. It has also been found in different types of human and rodent tumors. However, it has never been found in healthy human or rat tissues.

To date, it has been found in the central nervous system in inner ear hair cells and retinal ganglion cells.  Oncomodulin promotes axon regeneration in retinal ganglion cells and maintains functioning in mouse cochlear hair cells.

Structure
Oncomodulin is highly conserved across vertebrate evolution (NCBI database).  It is a smaller calcium-binding protein (11.7-kDa) which resembles the EF-hand domain of calmodulin (32% sequence identity), alpha-parvalbumin (54%), S100-beta (34%), and calbindin (25%) and resembles alpha-parvalbumin in its N-terminal region (52%).  It has a 40-residue N-terminal domain with an inactive calcium binding site and a 70-residue EF-hand domain with one low affinity Ca2+ and Mg2+ binding site and one high-affinity Ca2+ site.

Oncomodulin has a crystal structure and is a 12,000 Mr protein. Two Ca2+ atoms in oncomodulin are co-ordinated with seven oxygen atoms and one water molecule. The third Ca2+ atom is co-ordinated with five oxygen atoms and two water molecules. Both of the Ca2+ molecules are bound to the CD and EF loops. The distances between Ca and O in the molecular structure range from 2.07 A to 2.64 A, which indicates that the molecule is tightly bound together. The backbone structure of oncomodulin closely resembles parvalbumin. It has a 50% amino acid identity to parvalbumin.

Mechanism of Action 
For oncomodulin to work properly, it must have elevated levels of cAMP and the sugar mannose, which is present in the vitreous of the eye. cAMP increases the effectiveness of oncomodulin several times more than just having oncomodulin and cAMP alone. Oncomodulin is activated by activating downstream signaling of Ca2+, calmodulin kinase, and gene transcription.

Oncomodulin mRNA production peaks within a day of an inflammatory response. During inflammation, macrophages are released into the eye in order to promote axon regeneration. Inducing an inflammatory response enables the ability of sensory neurons to regenerate their axons through the dorsal roots. The secretion of oncomodulin from macrophages stimulates the growth of neurons. The identity of the receptor for oncomodulin that allows axon regeneration is unknown. It is also unknown whether oncomodulin promotes regeneration elsewhere in the immune system. Signaling complexes that may be important to work with oncomodulin include PI 3 Kinase, MAP Kinase, JAK/STAT, and CaM Kinase II. The depletion of oncomodulin from media in which macrophages grow removes the axon-promoting activity of the media.

Neutrophils are also an important component of oncomodulin activation. Without neutrophils present, macrophages are less effective at stimulating extensive regeneration of neurons. This is because neutrophils enter the area of inflammation before macrophages do. In addition to macrophages, neutrophils are also a major source of oncomodulin production.

In rats, the gene that encodes oncomodulin is under control of a solo oncomodulin LTR that comes from an endogenous intracisternal A-particle. The oncomodulin LTR is only present in rats. Oncomodulin levels are highest in the rat out of all other species that have been previously investigated.

Uses 
Oncomodulin plays a key role in patients with eye injuries. It is thought that it can reverse eye damage caused from glaucoma. Oncomodulin is also thought to switch on a variety of genes that are associated with axon regrowth. Eye drops with oncomodulin can be a useful method of promoting nerve regrowth in mild cases of optic gliomas. Oncomodulin has also been seen to stimulate outgrowth from peripheral sensory neurons.

Injections with zymosan can promote macrophages to enter the eye and secrete oncomodulin. This is an effective method of treatment in patients with minor eye damage. Injections into patients with severed spinal cords has shown to restore partial motor function.

See also
Oncomodulin 2

References

Proteins
Growth factors